The country of Mongolia is divided into 21 provinces (aimag) and the capital (нийслэл, niislel) Ulaanbaatar.

Secondary subdivisions outside Ulaanbaatar are called "sum" (сум, often transcribed as soum). In 2006, Mongolia had 331 sums. Sums are further subdivided into bags (баг). While sums always have a permanent settlement as administrative center, many bags don't.

Ulaanbaatar is divided into nine düüregs (дүүрэг, usually translated as district), which are further subdivided into khoroos (хороо, most often translated as subdistrict, microdistrict or simply district).

Administrative Units 
Officially, Mongolia is divided into 3 administrative tiers, with different types of administrative unit on each tier:

References 

 
Mongolia